The Percy Nicholls Award is an American engineering prize.

It has been given annually since 1942 for "notable scientific or industrial achievement in the field of solid fuels". The prize is given jointly by the American Institute of Mining, Metallurgical, and Petroleum Engineers and American Society of Mechanical Engineers.

See also

 List of engineering awards
 List of mechanical engineering awards

References 
 Percy Nicholls Award

Awards of the American Society of Mechanical Engineers
Awards of the American Institute of Mining, Metallurgical, and Petroleum Engineers
Combustion engineering awards
Awards established in 1942
1942 establishments in the United States